All Together Now is a Philippine television situational comedy series broadcast by GMA Network. Directed by Al Quinn, it stars Christopher de Leon, Johnny Delgado, Edgar Mortiz and Pops Fernandez. It premiered on October 21, 2003 on the network's KiliTV line up. The series concluded on September 7, 2004 with a total of 47 episodes. It was replaced by Bahay Mo Ba 'To? in its timeslot.

The series is streaming online on YouTube.

Cast and characters

Lead cast
 Christopher de Leon as DJ Blue / Tong
 Johnny Delgado as Mamboy
 Edgar Mortiz as Edgie
 Pops Fernandez as Rina

Supporting cast
 Angel Locsin as Tetet
 K Brosas as Kakai
 Sherilyn Reyes as LL
 Ethel Booba as Joey
 Alicia Mayer
 Francine Prieto
 Railey Valeroso
 Drew Arellano as Andrew
 Maggie Wilson
 Valerie Concepcion
 Gary Lim
 Gene Padilla
 Alma Moreno as Tudis
 Contin Roque as Contin

References

External links
 

2003 Philippine television series debuts
2004 Philippine television series endings
Filipino-language television shows
GMA Network original programming
Philippine comedy television series